Crime and Punishment is a 1917 American silent crime drama film directed by Lawrence B. McGill and starring Derwent Hall Caine, Cherrie Coleman and Lydia Knott. Based on Fyodor Dostoevsky's 1866 novel of the same title, it shifts the setting to portray the protagonist as a Russian immigrant in America.

Cast
 Derwent Hall Caine as Rodion Raskolnikoff 
 Cherrie Coleman as Dounia, His Sister 
 Lydia Knott as His Mother 
 Carl Gerard as Razmouhin Porkovitch 
 Sidney Bracey as Andreas Valeskoff 
 Marguerite Courtot as Sonia Marmeladoff 
 Robert W. Cummings as Porphyus

References

Bibliography
 Ken Wlaschin. Silent Mystery and Detective Movies: A Comprehensive Filmography. McFarland, 2009.

External links

1917 films
1917 crime drama films
American crime drama films
Films directed by Lawrence B. McGill
American silent feature films
1910s English-language films
Pathé Exchange films
Arrow Film Corporation films
American black-and-white films
1910s American films
Silent American drama films